Elizabeth Savala Casquel  is a Brazilian actress and businesswoman.

Biography 
Elizabeth was studying at Eduardo Prado High School when actress Lourdes de Moraes referred her to the School of Dramatic Arts in São Paulo. At 19 years of age, she married actor Marcelo Picchi and their marriage lasted 11 years. They have four children together: Thiago Picchi, Diogo, and the twins Ciro and Tadeu, who are also actors. In 1978, she was elected by the Brazilian variety TV programme Fantástico, one of the ten most beautiful women in the country, despite being known for not caring about her looks. She has been married since 1986 to theatrical architect and producer Camilo Attila.

References

External links 

Living people
Actresses from São Paulo
Brazilian people of Italian descent
Brazilian television actresses
Brazilian telenovela actresses
Brazilian film actresses
Brazilian stage actresses
Year of birth missing (living people)